Platform-based design is defined in Taxonomies for the Development and Verification of Digital Systems as "an integration oriented design approach emphasizing systematic reuse, for developing complex products based upon platforms and compatible hardware and software virtual component, intended to reduce development risks, costs and time to market".

See also
 Electronic design automation
 Electronic system-level design and verification

References

Electronic design automation